Viburnum stellato-tomentosum is a species of plant in the Adoxaceae family. It is found in Costa Rica and Panama. It is threatened by habitat loss.

References

stellato-tomentosum
Near threatened plants
Taxonomy articles created by Polbot
Plants described in 1881
Taxobox binomials not recognized by IUCN